Oxathres is a genus of beetles in the family Cerambycidae, containing the following species:

 Oxathres boliviana Monne & Tavakilian, 2011
 Oxathres decorata Monné, 1990
 Oxathres erotyloides Bates, 1864
 Oxathres guyanensis Monne & Tavakilian, 2011
 Oxathres implicata Melzer, 1926
 Oxathres maculosa Monne & Tavakilian, 2011
 Oxathres muscosa Bates, 1864
 Oxathres navicula Bates, 1864
 Oxathres ornata Monné, 1976
 Oxathres proxima Monné, 1976
 Oxathres quadrimaculata Monné, 1976
 Oxathres scripta Lacordaire, 1872
 Oxathres sparsa Melzer, 1927

References

Acanthocinini